Robert Berri (16 December 1912 – 22 November 1989) was a French film actor. He appeared in 100 films between 1937 and 1979.

Selected filmography

References

External links

1912 births
1989 deaths
French male film actors
Male actors from Paris
20th-century French male actors